Sir John Wynn, 5th Baronet (1628 – 11 January 1719) was a Welsh landowner and Tory politician who sat in the English and British House of Commons between 1679 and 1713.

Early life
Wynn was the only son of Henry Wynn of Rhiwgoch, Merioneth, and was educated at the Inner Temple, 1646. He inherited the Watstay Estate through his marriage to Jane Evans (daughter of Eyton Evans of Watstay), which he renamed the Wynnstay Estate. He also, allegedly, won the manor of Stanwardine in Shropshire from Thomas Corbett in a snail race.

He succeeded his cousin Sir Richard Wynn, 4th Baronet as a baronet in 1674 but did not inherit the Gwydyr Estate, which passed to his predecessor's daughter Mary (later wife of Robert Bertie, 1st Duke of Ancaster and Kesteven).

Career
Wynn served as High Sheriff of Denbighshire for 1671–3, as High Sheriff of Caernarvonshire for 1674-75 and as High Sheriff of Merionethshire for 1675–1676. He was Custos Rotulorum of Merionethshire for 1678–1688, 1690–96 and 1700–1711.

Wynn was returned as Member of Parliament for Merioneth in 1679. He was returned again in 1685 and held the seat until 1695. At the 1698 English general election he was returned as MP for Caernarvon Boroughs. At the 1705 English general election he was returned unopposed as MP for Caernarvonshire. He was returned unopposed at the 1708 British general election and the 1710 British general election. He retired at the 1713 British general election

Later life
Wynn lived into his nineties, mainly residing in London, but died without issue in 1719. On his death the Wynn baronetcy became extinct and the ancient House of Aberffraw (which claimed direct descent from Rhodri Mawr ap Merfyn in the late 9th century and through him to the legendary line of Brutus) was left without known male issue.

Possible heir and relatives
Had Thomas Jones (Twm Siôn Cati) really been the illegitimate son of John "Wynn" ap Maredudd (as claimed by Sir John Wynn, 1st Baronet in his family history), his children would have been next in line, illegitimate sons having the same rights of inheritance as legitimate ones under ancient Welsh law. There are also several claims that "lost" relatives such as a supposed Colonel Hugh Wynn who is alleged to have moved to Virginia and raised a family. 

However, with no clear heir, Sir John bequeathed the entire Wynnstay estate to Jane Thelwall, great-granddaughter of the first baronet and wife of Sir William Williams, 2nd Baronet (c. 1665 – 20 October 1740). Sir John Wynn and Sir William Williams were the two largest landowners in north Wales at that time and together the combined estate dwarfed all others. In honour of his wife's ancestry Sir William Williams changed his name to Sir William Williams-Wynn of Wynnstay.

The current baronet is Sir David Watkin Williams-Wynn, 11th Baronet (born 1940).

Notes

References

Further reading
 

1628 births
1719 deaths
People from Merionethshire
Baronets in the Baronetage of England
British MPs 1707–1708
British MPs 1708–1710
British MPs 1710–1713
House of Cunedda
Members of the Parliament of England (pre-1707) for constituencies in Wales
Members of the Parliament of Great Britain for Welsh constituencies
High Sheriffs of Denbighshire
High Sheriffs of Caernarvonshire
High Sheriffs of Merionethshire
17th-century Welsh politicians
English MPs 1679
English MPs 1680–1681
English MPs 1685–1687
English MPs 1689–1690
English MPs 1690–1695
English MPs 1698–1700
English MPs 1701
English MPs 1701–1702
English MPs 1702–1705
English MPs 1705–1707
Members of Parliament for Caernarfon